Marie Ďurovičová ( Kovářová; 11 May 1927 – 4 January 2023) was a Czech gymnast who competed in the 1948 Summer Olympics, winning gold in the team event. She was born in Luleč.

References

1927 births
2023 deaths
Czech female artistic gymnasts
Olympic gymnasts of Czechoslovakia
Gymnasts at the 1948 Summer Olympics
Olympic gold medalists for Czechoslovakia
Olympic medalists in gymnastics
Medalists at the 1948 Summer Olympics
People from Vyškov District
Sportspeople from the South Moravian Region